801 Naval Air Squadron (NAS) was a Fleet Air Arm squadron of the Royal Navy formed in 1933 which fought in World War II, the Korean War and the Falklands War.

Fleet Air Arm of the Royal Air Force
The squadron was formed on 3 April 1933 as part of the Fleet Air Arm, with the promotion of No. 401 Flight to squadron status. The squadron was equipped with the Fairey Flycatcher and Hawker Nimrod aboard . The Flycatchers were replaced in 1934 by the Hawker Osprey and the Nimrods were retired in 1936. The squadron was re-equipped with the Blackburn Skua and Gloster Gladiator in 1939 just before the squadron was transferred to the Admiralty.

Second World War 
In January 1940, 801 NAS was based at RNAS Donibristle with the Blackburn Skua, playing a key role in the early part of the war with operations in Norway while deploying from the aircraft carrier . Following an attack on Trondheim on 22 September, Skua L2942 piloted by Sub-Lieutenant Bernard Wigginton with Leading Aircraftman Kenneth King as his gunner, was unable to find their carrier and crash landed in neutral Sweden.

In June 1945, naval fighter wings were reformed as carrier groups with 801 NAS, 828 NAS, 880 NAS and 1771 NAS becoming the 8th Carrier Air Group. During this deployment 801 NAS claimed thirteen enemy aircraft of various types, for the loss of three Hurricanes and four Fulmars. Two of the Fulmars were brought down by friendly fire.

Korean War 
Glory was deployed in theatre from 3 April 1951 to 30 September 1951 and from 8 November 1952 to the Korean Armistice Agreement of 27 July 1953.  801 NAS was embarked on the second tour of duty.

Sea Furies could be armed with either two bombs or four rockets and drop tanks in both cases. The aircraft were mainly used in the ground attack role armed with bombs and rockets, but they were also engaged in air-to-air combat with the much faster MiG-15.

The squadron suffered seven casualties.

1960s to 1980s 
On 18 March 1962, 801 squadron was reformed at Lossiemouth in the strike role with Buccaneers. The squadron subsequently received the 1967 Boyd Trophy, an annual award for the best squadron in the Fleet Air Arm, for its efforts in bringing the Buccaneer into service.

In March 1969 the ship returned home to spend the next year in Home and Mediterranean waters. The squadron eventually disbanded at Lossiemouth on 21 July 1970.

In January 1981 the squadron re-equipped with the Sea Harrier FRS.1 at RNAS Yeovilton.

Falklands War 
The squadron operated the Sea Harrier equipped with Blue Fox radars aboard  during the Falklands War. The squadron was supplemented by five pilots from 899 NAS and was under the command of Lieutenant Commander Nigel "Sharkey" Ward. On 18 May a further four pilots of 809 NAS transfer to the squadron from MV Atlantic Conveyor with their four Sea Harrier FRS.1 aircraft.

801 NAS Pilots
Lieutenant Commander Nigel 'Sharkey' Ward (CO) Category:Recipients of the Distinguished Service Cross (United Kingdom)
Lieutenant Commander Doug Hamilton
Lieutenant Charlie Cantan
Lieutenant Alan Curtis (KIA),
Lieutenant Brian Haigh
Lieutenant Stephen Harrison-Thomas Category:Recipients of the Distinguished Service Cross (United Kingdom)
Flight Lieutenant Ian Mortimer
Lieutenant Mike Watson
899 NAS Pilots
Lieutenant Commander Robin Kent
Lieutenant Commander John Eyton-Jones (KIA)
Lieutenant Commander Mike Broadwater.
Flight Lieutenant Paul Barton

809 NAS Pilots

 Lieutenant Commander Tim Gedge
 Lieutenant Commander Dave Braithwaite 
 Lieutenant Commander Alistair Craig
 Lieutenant Dave Austin

801 Squadron shot down 8 Argentine aircraft.

1 May 1982 - A Mirage III of FAA Grupo 8 shot down north of West Falkland by Barton using a Sidewinder. The Argentine pilot ejected.
1 May 1982 - A Mirage III of FAA Grupo 8 damaged in same incident north of West Falkland by Thomas using a Sidewinder air-to-air missile. The Mirage was then shot down over Stanley by Argentine anti-aircraft defences killing the pilot.
1 May 1982 - A Canberra B62 of FAA Grupo 2 was shot down north of Falklands by Curtis using a Sidewinder. The Argentine pilots ejected but were not rescued.
21 May 1982 - A Pucará of FAA Grupo 3 was shot down near Darwin by Ward in one of three Sea Harriers using 30 mm cannon fire. The pilot ejected from the aircraft at about 40 ft above the ground, he survived and walked back to Goose Green.
21 May 1982 - Three Dagger As of FAA Grupo 6 were shot down north of Port Howard, West Falkland using Sidewinders, two by Thomas and the other by Ward.  All three Argentine pilots successfully ejected.
1 June 1982 - A C-130E Hercules of FAA Transport Grupo 1 was shot down 50 miles north of Pebble Island by Ward using two AIM-9 Sidewinders and cannon. The crew of seven were killed.

Losses
801 NAS lost four aircraft and two pilots during the conflict.

Both pilots - Lt Cdr Eyton-Jones in XZ452 and Lt Curtis in XZ453 - were killed and no trace of either aircraft found.
29 May 1982 - Sea Harrier ZA174 was being made ready for take-off, and slid off the deck when Invincible turned sharply into the wind. The pilot - Lt Cdr Broadwater - ejected and was picked up.
1 June 1982 - XZ456 was shot down while on an armed recce by a Roland surface-to-air missile to the south of Port Stanley, by GADA 601.  The pilot - Flight Lieutenant Mortimer - ejected and was rescued by a Sea King from 820 NAS after nine hours in the water.

Gallantry Awards
Lieutenant Commander Ward and Lieutenant Thomas were each awarded the Distinguished Service Cross for their conduct and leadership throughout the campaign.
Lieutenant Commander Kent and Flight Lieutenant Mortimer were both Mentioned in Despatches. Lt Curtis was posthumously Mentioned in Despatches

1982 to 2000s 
In March 1997, 801 NAS was deployed onboard HMS Illustrious as part of the Carrier Task Group assigned to the Armilla patrol when it took part in Operation Jural, enforcing the 'no fly' zone over southern Iraq. Equipped with FA2 Sea Harriers, the Squadron operated alongside GR7 Harriers from No.1 Squadron RAF who had joined them on the carrier for a month of combined exercises and operations. Between 7–12 March, the Harriers flew 28 sorties (18 over Iraqi territory).

Decommissioning 

On Tuesday 28 March 2006 a ceremony was held at RNAS Yeovilton, with Commander A J W Rae as the last Sea Harrier squadron commanding officer, to mark the withdrawal from service of the Royal Navy's Sea Harrier FA2s. The final Sea Harrier was withdrawn from service on 31 March 2006 at RNAS Yeovilton and the squadron disbanded. Prior to decommissioning, all aircraft adopted the omega symbol on their tail-fin in recognition of 801 NAS being the last operators of an all-British fixed-wing fighter aircraft. This harks back to the use of this symbol by 892 Naval Air Squadron, whose McDonnell Douglas Phantom FG.1s were the last conventional fixed-wing aircraft used by the Fleet Air Arm.

801 NAS was due to recommission in March 2007, under the command of Commander K Seymour, to operate the Harrier GR7 and GR9 from RAF Cottesmore. However, due to lack of manpower all former 801 and 800 NAS (their sister squadron) personnel formed a "Naval Strike Wing" within RAF Cottesmore, thus severing all remaining ties to their former home at RNAS Yeovilton. On 1 April 2010, Naval Strike Wing reverted to the identity of 800 Naval Air Squadron.

Aircraft flown
During its lifespan, 801 Squadron has flown fourteen different aircraft types:
 BAE Sea Harrier FRS.1 & FA.2
 Blackburn Buccaneer S.1 & S.2
 Hawker Sea Hurricane Ia & Ib
 Blackburn Skua II
 Blackburn Roc I
 Fairey Flycatcher I
 Gloster Sea Gladiator
 de Havilland Sea Hornet PR.22 & F.20
 Hawker Nimrod I
 Hawker Osprey
 Hawker Sea Fury FB.11 & T.20
 Hawker Sea Hawk FGA.4 & FGA.6
 Supermarine Seafire Ib, IIc, L.IIe, L.III & F.XV
 Supermarine Spitfire Va & Vb

References

Citations

Bibliography

External links 
 RAF Cottesmore entry on squadron
 Fleet Air Arm Archive
 SHAR swansong

Recipients of the Distinguished Service Cross (United Kingdom)
800 series Fleet Air Arm squadrons
Military units and formations of the United Kingdom in the Falklands War
Military units and formations of the United Kingdom in the Korean War
Military units and formations established in 1933
Military units and formations disestablished in 2007